Col de Tende Road Tunnel is a 3182 metre long road tunnel running under Col de Tende between France and Italy. It was inaugurated in 1882 and it was until 1964 the longest road tunnel in the Alps. At its opening time it was the world's longest road tunnel. Altitude on the French side: 1,280 m; Italian side: 1,321 m.

The tunnel and its access roads were damaged by Storm Alex in October 2020, closing the tunnel. , repair work is expected to be completed by the end of 2025.

(From France, to Italy)

References

External links
 

Road tunnels in France
Road tunnels in Italy
Tunnels completed in 1882
1882 establishments in Italy
1882 establishments in France
Tunnels in the Alps
Limone Piemonte